"My Red Hot Car" is a song by Squarepusher, released as a single in 2001 on Warp Records. The lead track on the single is "My Red Hot Car (Girl)", which leaves the pop music aspects of the song intact. An extended version of "My Red Hot Car" is featured on the album Go Plastic. My Red Hot Car is notable for two different hidden tracks, based on format: the CD version features an ambient piece after 23 minutes of silence, while the vinyl features a percussion-less version of "I Wish You Obelisk" presented behind a silent, locked groove, meaning the needle must be lifted halfway through the second side and placed after the locked groove in order to hear it.

The single was selected as NME Single of the Week in its week of release.

Track listing

Compact disc pressing

Vinyl pressing

Trivia
Although the song title is "My Red Hot Car", the actual vocal sample in the track says "I'm going to fuck you with my red hot cock". This can be heard more clearly in the "(Girl)" version of the track.

Samples:
Drum breaks used in the track include Jimmy McGriff – "The Worm", the Winstons – "Amen, Brother" and Lyn Collins – "Think (About It)".

Song usage
Miss Kittin used "My Red Hot Car" on her mix album A Bugged Out Mix.

The song is also played during a scene in the film Any Way the Wind Blows, and has been used as theme music for the MTV Italy show On the Beach.

References

External links
"My Red Hot Car" at the Warp Records website

2001 songs
2001 singles
Squarepusher songs
Warp (record label) singles
UK garage songs